Seire is a 2021 South Korean horror film directed by Park Kang and starring Seo Hyun-woo, Shim Eun-woo,  and Kim Woo-kyum.

Cast
 Seo Hyun-woo as Woo-jin
 
 Shim Eun-woo
 
 Kim Woo-kyum
 Seo Jin-won as President of the Health Center

Release
The film premiered at the 26th Busan International Film Festival in October 2021. The film will receive a theatrical release in 2022.

Reception
Seire won FIPRESCI award at 26th Busan International Film Festival. 

Alain Elliot of Nerdly rated the film 4 stars out of 5, calling it "the perfect showcase of how to blend old tales and folklore in a modern setting and telling real stories that are relevant now". 

Chad Collins of Dread Central rated the film 3.5 stars out of 5, calling it "a haunting, austere ghost story." 

Neil Young of Screen Daily wrote a positive review of the film, stating that it "balances psychological probings and potentially supernatural elements in deliberately disorienting and accomplished fashion." 

Panos Kotzathanasis of HanCinema gave the film a positive review, writing, "The overall minimalism with the occasional splashes of visually impressive moments appears to be a well-fitted approach for the "new generation" of horror films, along with the combination of a number of art-house elements, as the richness in context." 

Sean Parker of Horror Obsessive wrote a positive review of the film.

References

External links
 
 

South Korean horror films
2021 horror films